Tilehurst is an electoral ward of the Borough of Reading, in the English county of Berkshire. It forms part of the larger Reading suburb of Tilehurst, which also includes parts of the borough's Kentwood and Norcot wards, together with the civil parish of Tilehurst Without that is outside the borough boundary in the district of West Berkshire. The ward is bordered, in clockwise order, by Norcot ward, Tilehurst Without civil parish and Kentwood ward. It lies entirely within the Reading West parliamentary constituency.

As of 2016, there were just over 9,000 people living in Tilehurst ward, of whom 21% were aged under 16, 20.4% were aged 65 and over, and 10% were born outside the UK. The population lives in a total of 3,868 dwellings, of which almost 39% are semi-detached houses, around 30% in terraced houses and over 15% in detached houses. Of the population aged between 16 and 74, approximately 67% are in employment and 3.6% are unemployed. Of those in employment, 37% are in managerial, professional or technical occupations, with 16% in professional occupations.

As with all Reading wards, the ward elects three councillors to Reading Borough Council.  Elections since 2004 are generally held by thirds, with elections in three years out of four, although the 2022 elections were for all councillors due to boundary changes. The ward councillors are currently Meri O'Connell, James Moore and Anne Thompson, all of whom are members of the Liberal Democrat party.

References

Wards of Reading